UTC Swindon is a University Technical College (UTC) in Swindon, England that opened in September 2014 for students of ages 14–19. The college specialises in engineering and is sponsored by Oxford Brookes University and Johnson Matthey Fuel Cells.

The campus is on the northwestern edge of Swindon Railway Village, built in the 1840s for workers at the Great Western Railway's Swindon Works. The college is partly newly built and partly in a single-storey building of c. 1845 which was formerly part of the GWR School. Also on the site is a preserved cast iron water tower of 1870, which served the Works.

The college has capacity for 600 pupils.

History
The college opened in September 2014, and was formally opened by Prince Andrew in December of that year.

An Ofsted inspection in January 2017 rated the UTC as "inadequate" in almost every area. At that time the college was being led by the deputy principal, and had an enrolment of 153. Later that year Joanne Harper, Principal of UTC Reading, was appointed Executive Principal and the UTC came under the sponsorship of Activate Learning Education Trust.

The college's most recent Ofsted inspection was in 2020, with an overall judgement of 'requires improvement'. Leadership and management were rated Good but the quality of education was judged not yet good enough.

Academics
UTC Swindon begin the day at 8:30 and finish at 15:40, and attempt to provide the students with a full GCSE offer and industry-standard technical qualifications. Students enter at the start of Key Stage 4, in year 10, and at the start of Key Stage 5, the sixth form.

Key Stage 4
KS4 Core Curriculum includes GCSEs in English Language, English Literature, Mathematics, Biology, Chemistry and Physics. GCSE options are offered in GCSE Computer Science, GCSE OCR Systems Control in Engineering and BTEC Level 2 Award in eSports.

These are studied alongside a specialist qualification: NCFE Certificate in Engineering Studies, Certificate in Engineering Manufacture, or Digital Technology qualifications.

Key Stage 5
There are three pathways offered to the students: the A level pathway, the technical pathway and the  combined pathway. Each results in qualifications equivalent to three A levels. There are six A levels offered: Mathematics, Physics, Computer Science, Chemistry, Biology and English.

The technical qualifications are: 
BTEC Engineering Extended Diploma (3 A Level equivalent)
BTEC Engineering Diploma (2 A Level equivalent) with  BTEC IT Extended Certificate (1 A Level equivalent)
BTEC IT/Cyber Security Diploma (2 A Level equivalent) with BTEC Esports Extended Certificate (1 A Level equivalent)

and when combined with an A level
BTEC Engineering Diploma (2 A Levels)
BTEC IT Diploma (2 A Levels)
BTEC IT Extended Certificate (1 A Level)
BTEC Esports Extended Certificate (1 A Level)

References

External links
 
Department for Education information for UTC Swindon between September 2014 and August 2017, when it was re-brokered.

University Technical Colleges
Secondary schools in Swindon
Educational institutions established in 2014
2014 establishments in England
Oxford Brookes University